Na San railway station is a railway station located in Ban Na San Subdistrict, Ban Na San District, Surat Thani.

Train services 
 Special Express No. 41/42 Bangkok-Yala-Bangkok
 Express No. 83/84 Bangkok-Trang-Bangkok
 Express No. 85/86 Bangkok-Nakhon Si Thammarat-Bangkok
 Rapid No. 167/168 Bangkok-Kantang-Bangkok
 Rapid No. 171/172 Bangkok-Sungai Kolok-Bangkok
 Rapid No. 173/174 Bangkok-Nakhon Si Thammarat-Bangkok
 Local No. 445/446 Chumphon-Hat Yai Junction-Chumphon
 Local No. 447/448 Surat Thani-Sungai Kolok-Surat Thani

References 
 
 

Railway stations in Thailand